

About LIDÈ
LIDÈ Haiti is a comprehensive adolescent girls empowerment and education initiative serving communities across rural Haiti.

LIDÈ takes a whole-person approach to building capacity, empowerment and resiliency among at-risk adolescent girls and differently abled youth who have been denied equal access to education across rural Haiti.  Our creative arts programs enable girls to increase their creativity, resiliency, hope, motivation, problem-solving capacities and self-confidence. Our academic support programs expand girls' educational attainment by offering primary, secondary, university, and vocational school scholarships, training in literacy, numeracy, and computer skills, and tutoring in diverse subjects such as math, science, and French. Our health programming strengthens girls’ mental and physical health through daily nutritious meals, medical services, individualized counseling, family planning education, and psychosocial support services. And, our transitions program helps prepare participants for adulthood through training on career development and parenting education.  Combined, these programs create an ecosystem that allows girls to find their voices, thrive, and become actively engaged participants in their communities.

LIDÈ was established by Author Holiday Reinhorn, Actor Rainn Wilson and Dr. Kathryn Adams and was inspired by a short term project they participated in to provide healing through the arts for adolescent girls who had survived the 2010 earthquake in Haiti. During a two-week program, the three of them watched girls mend and find their own voices. Afterward, they watched those same girls try to hang on to those voices and teach other girls what they had learned. But they needed support, and so the idea of creating year-round programs aimed at building resiliency and empowering adolescent girls began and Lide was established as a non-profit in 2014.
LIDÈ now has over 75 staff, 96% of whom are Haitian women.  Lidè trains and employs locals within the Haitian communities it serves, and collaborates with grassroots organizations and schools so that programs derive from and meet local needs, strengthen and utilize local capacity, and foster the community support girls need to complete their educational journeys.

Who We Serve
LIDÈ programs reach at-risk girls ages 11 to 21 who are out of school or significantly behind in age-to-grade, live in rural underserved communities where the majority of the community is living in extreme poverty, have experienced trauma or live in chronic stress, live in situations of domestic labor, have or are currently suffering abuse, are experiencing food insecurity or the effects of malnutrition, and/or have a disability.

 Adolescent girls in Haiti face multiple challenges, including a high mental health burden, school attendance rates between 21 and 34%, and a high proportion of girls  who are not in any form of education, employment, or training.  These realities, exacerbated by Haiti’s ongoing natural disasters and political turmoil and instability, impede adolescent girls’ ability to build healthy relationships, cultivate their innate, educational, and economic potential, and serve as leaders in their communities.

Arts Programs
Girls in LIDÈ discover their unique voice through our arts programs, which include creative writing, theater, photography, and visual arts. which include creative writing, theater,  These programs are designed to support girls to: foster healthy relationships, appreciate diversity, strengthen their ability to  resolve conflict, and cultivate flexible thinking, adaptability, innovation, and hope.
The arts also enable girls to deepen awareness of their emotions, develop a growth mindset, improve their cognition and communication skills, build their ability to problem-solve, and develop a sense of dignity and confidence in their ability to create a better world.  Our arts programs become a gateway into an academic education as well as a means for improving literacy, leadership and critical thinking.

As part of this program, LIDÈ has hosted writers, actors, filmmakers, and photographers who come to share their skills with teachers, apprentices and students in master classes. These artists have included: David Choe,[2] Saelee Oh, Emily Baldoni, Stan Cahill, Philip PardI, Christopher Heltai, Jason Jaworski, Hannah Sparkman, Erin Shachory, Olivia Melodia, Kayla Stokes, Maya Wong, and Kezia Jean. LIDÈ also hosts interns from Haitian universities who are part of the HELP scholarship program, and master teachers from among Ciné Institute graduates.

Education Programs

LIDÈ enables girls to access formal and informal education and learning opportunities, offering literacy and numeracy instruction, primary and secondary school scholarships, computer skills training, individual tutoring, math and science education, and academic goal setting. 
Research shows that girls education including: increased economic growth,  yields tremendously positive outcomes across multiple domains, including: increased economic growth, reduction of child marriage and domestic violence, healthier mothers and babies, higher education rates for children, improved mental health for girls, reductions in climate change, reductions in terrorism, and increased female leadership in government.

Health Programs

To support girls' healthy development, LIDÈ provides nutrition, health education, counseling, and medical services to our participants.  Our team of nurses and health partners provide regular health screenings, reproductive health education, Covid-19 prevention education, and training in first aid and CPR. LIDÈ also offers mental health supports through individualized psychological counseling to participants in need, home visits to program participants, and support calls to participants and their families.

Our community food program serves hundreds of meals a week to our participants, who receive a meal on every program day, often the only meal girls will have that day.  These meals are prepared locally by women in the communities and have a variety of healthy foods including vegetables, whole grains, and beans, which are all sourced locally.

Programs for Differently Abled Youth

While girls with disabilities are included within our rural programs, LIDÈ also provides a special program in Gonaives that offers individuated and adaptive programs to a group of differently abled youth in the Gonaives area.  These kids, both boys and girls, have adapted to disabilities that include cerebral palsy, hydrocephaly, muscular dystrophy, and other genetic conditions by utilizing the strengths within them — especially those found within their hearts.  
The program for these youth still follow the same thematic curriculum as our other programs, but activities are adapted to their abilities while building additional strengths through integration of the arts into:

The program for these youth still follow the same thematic curriculum as our other programs, but activities are adapted to their abilities while building additional strengths through integration of the arts into:
• Physical therapy
• Literacy
• Basic computer skills
• Social interaction skills
• Occupational therapy or training
• Foundational academic skills

Impact

LIDÈ participants are learning to read, getting scholarships to begin, continue, and complete primary and secondary school, building their psychosocial resilience and self-confidence through our arts programming, improving their physical and mental health through counseling and medical services, preparing for employment and family life through our transitions program and strengthening their nutrition through the thousands of meals we serve a year to participants-meals that are often their only source of daily food in an atmosphere of food scarcity. And, we know that our participants are transmitting the skills they are learning to others, particularly siblings and peers.  This dynamic multiplies LIDÈ’s impact, as capacities developed ripple beyond program participants to diverse members of each community we serve.
In 2021, we served 806 adolescent girls across 8 rural communities in Haiti, offered 134 scholarships, held 13 ongoing literacy classes, grew our staff to 74, served over 20,000 meals, received 180 more computers, had 14,513 website visits, grew a community of over 12,000 followers on social media, and tripled our annual budget by raising over $1.6 million in funds from over 8,000 individual donors.

In addition, a 2021 survey of a subset of LIDÈ parents showed that 96% of those surveyed see such positive changes in their daughters as increased confidence, helpfulness, motivation, and/or capacity to collaborate, all prerequisites for success in the 21st century. 93% of parents surveyed say they have seen both increases in literacy and economic empowerment among their daughters as a result of their participation.

How to get involved
Lidé has multiple spaces where you can keep up to date with current projects such as Instagram, Facebook, Youtube, and Lidé’s Website. In addition, they release a quarterly Newsletter which review’s projects such as the launching of the psychosocial support training program that was made possible by the collaboration with the Obama Foundation’s Girls Opportunity Alliance. Lidé also provides a current needs shopping list where individuals can donate school supplies.

References

Educational organizations based in Haiti